Searching or search may refer to:

Computing technology
 Search algorithm, including keyword search
 :Category:Search algorithms
 Search and optimization for problem solving in artificial intelligence
 Search engine technology, software for finding information
 Enterprise search, software or services for finding information within organizations
 Web search engine, a service for finding information on the World Wide Web

Music
 Search (band), a Malaysian rock band
 "Searchin'", a 1957 song originally performed by The Coasters
 "Searching" (China Black song), a 1991 song by China Black
 "Searchin'" (CeCe Peniston song), a 1993 song by CeCe Peniston
 "Searchin' (I Gotta Find a Man)", a 1983 dance song by Hazell Dean
 "Searching" (INXS song), a 1997 song by INXS
 "Searching" (Pete Rock & CL Smooth song), a 1995 song from the Pete Rock & CL Smooth album The Main Ingredient
 Searching, a 2013 album by Jay Diggins
 "Searching", a 1980 single by Change
 "Searching", a 2004 song by Joe Satriani from his album Is There Love in Space?
 "Searchin'", a 1981 song on the Blackfoot album Marauder
 "Searching", a 1976 song by Lynyrd Skynyrd from the album Gimme Back My Bullets
 "Searching", a 1976 song by Roy Ayers from the album Vibrations

Television
 Search (American TV series), a 1972–1973 American science fiction TV series that aired on NBC
 Search (South Korean TV series), a 2020 South Korean television series
 "Searching" (Desperate Housewives), the 150th episode of the ABC television series Desperate Housewives
 "The Search", the third episode of the 1965 Doctor Who serial The Space Museum

Organizations
 Society for Education Action and Research in Community Health, a non-governmental organization in Maharashtra, India
 Study of Environmental Arctic Change, a research program

Other uses
 Gay Search, a British television anchor and gardener
 Sara Opal Search, an American composer
 Searching (film), a 2018 American thriller film
 Searching (horse), a racehorse
 Bayesian search theory, the application of Bayesian statistics to finding lost objects
 Search theory, in economics (typically optimal stopping-related)
 Search and seizure, legal term

See also

 
 
 Find (disambiguation)
 The Search (disambiguation)
 Searcher (disambiguation)
 The Searchers (disambiguation)
 Research (disambiguation)